The Top 2000 is an annual Dutch marathon radio programme that plays the 2,000 songs voted most popular of all time. The show runs 24 hours a day, starting Christmas and ending on New Year's Eve. The show is hosted by the Dutch national radio station NPO Radio 2. A significant part of the population of the Netherlands listens to the broadcast each year; during the 2019 edition, Radio 2 had a national radio market share of 17.7 percent. In regard of its popularity and notoriety, the show is often called , the chart of charts.

The Top 2000, first held in 1999 to inaugurate the new millennium, was intended to be a one-time event. It became immensely popular. Following this success, Radio 2 decided to make it an annual programme.

The broadcast initially started at midnight on  Second Christmas Day (also known as Boxing Day). From 2009 onwards, the show begins broadcasting on 25 December, Christmas Day. From 2009 to 2015, the show started at noon. From 2015 to 2018 the show started at 9:00, with 2019 starting at 8:00 in the morning and 2020 starting right after midnight. It continues until midnight of New Year's Eve.

People are allowed to visit the studio. To enter, people must pay an entrance fee for a timed ticket. Because of the popularity of the show and the small size of the studio, visitors are only allowed to stay for a limited period of time; tickets sell out quickly.

Voting
During the six-to-seven day broadcast, the station broadcasts a set of 2,000 songs that have been voted on by the show's audience via Internet voting to be the "most popular songs of all time". The first year of voting was limited to a set list of 2000 songs that the users ranked themselves. Radio 2 changed the format in 2005 to allow voters to nominate their own suggestions. In 2008, Radio 2 used a different voting format: the votes from the previous nine years were compiled to create a "jubilee list" for the tenth anniversary of the radio show.

People can choose as few as five to as many as 35 songs. The voting period lasts one week, starting late November or early December. People can vote through the radio channel's website on any Internet device during this period. Hosts of the radio channel tour the Netherlands in a bus (which means 'ballot box', but literally translates to 'voting bus') during the period of voting to promote the show. People who visit the bus can also submit their songs there.

Voters can choose which version of a certain song they prefer. These include covers, live performances or full versions whose running time exceed mainstream radio standards. The eventual lineup of the program can contain multiple versions of one song.

For listeners to know if or when their favourite songs get aired, the running order, which includes the date and time songs are set to air, is revealed at least a week prior to the start of the show's broadcast. Since the show is aired all day and night, it's not uncommon for some people to set their alarms to listen to certain songs on the show.

Other media
In 2002, Radio 2 added the television show Top 2000 a Go-go to the broadcast. The show contains quizzes, live performances and clips of various songs on the list, as well as interviews with performers and artists featured in the all-time charts. The following year they added Top 2000 in Concert, where various Dutch artists are invited to sing one of their favorite songs, along with one of their own songs. The concert is typically broadcast on New Year's Eve, right after the end of Top 2000.

Hosts

Current

Bart Arens (since 2015)
Wouter van der Goes (since 2014)
Desiree van der Heiden (since 2022)
Frank van 't Hof (since 2015)
Jeroen van Inkel (since 2020)
Jeroen Kijk in de Vegte (2001–02, since 2020)
Morad El Ouakili (since 2022)
Paul Rabbering (2018–20, since 2022)
Jan-Willem Roodbeen (2006–12, 2014–18, since 2020)
Annemieke Schollaardt (since 2017)
Gijs Staverman (since 2013)
Ruud de Wild (since 2016)
Emmely de Wilt (since 2019)

Former

Marc Adriani (2009–2012, 2014)
Giel Beelen (2020-21)
Jurgen van den Berg (2011)
Leo Blokhuis (2019)
Carolien Borgers (2020-21)
Cobus Bosscha (2009)
Evelien de Bruijn (2016–18)
Daniël Dekker (1999–2008, 2011, 2013)
Gerard Ekdom (2015–17)
Sjors Fröhlich (1999)
Sander Guis (2011–13)
Bert Haandrikman (2002–2015)
Sander de Heer (2007–2014)
Tom Herlaar (2004)
Marisa Heutink (2016)
Ruud Hermans (2001, 2003–04)
Corné Klijn (2011, 2015)
Kasper Kooij (2012–13)
Bert Kranenbarg (1999–2008, 2010, 2012)
Pedro van Looij (2000–01)
Ferry Maat (1999–2000)
Riks Ozinga (2001–02)
Hans Schiffers (1999–2014)
Cielke Sijben (2017)
Hans Smit (2004–06)
Frits Spits (1999–2000, 2002, 2005–08)
Stefan Stasse (1999–2010, 2012, 2015–18)
Ron Stoeltie (1999–2002, 2004–08)
Henk van Steeg (2011–13)
Rob Stenders (2009, 2015–16, 2018–19)
Harjo Thijs (1999)
Roderick Veelo (2003)
Rick van Velthuysen (2018–19, 2021)
Jasper de Vries (2014–15)
Alfred van de Wege (2010–12)
Jeffrey Willems (1999–2000, 2002–05)

Notable occurrences within the list
"Bohemian Rhapsody" by Queen has traditionally been voted the most popular song on the countdown, with Boudewijn de Groot's "" achieving the top spot in 2005 (as the first Dutch and currently only Dutch-language song to do so) and the Eagles' "Hotel California" doing the same in 2010 and 2014. "Roller Coaster" by Dutch singer Danny Vera surprisingly ended up on the #1 spot for the 2020 edition, after having been the highest debuting song of all time the previous year at #4.

Up until 2018, The Beatles consistently occupied the most spots in the list, but in 2019, Queen took over the role as the Top 2000's main supplier with 37 songs.

The song with the highest position in its debut year in the list (from 2000 onwards) is "Roller Coaster", from Dutch country singer Danny Vera in 2019, entering in fourth place. The highest-scoring foreign newcomer was Adele with "Someone Like You" in 2011, placing sixth.

Some songs enter or get a higher placement because of certain events. On 27 November 2015, it was announced that John Lennon's song "Imagine" was voted number one for the first time, in association with the piano act of Davide Martello after the November 2015 Paris attacks. In 2019, farmers across the Netherlands protested against regulations limiting nitrogen emissions. In support of those farmers, a farmers' alliance called people on social media to vote for "" of the Dutch band Normaal. This resulted in the song entering the list that year in ninth place. In 2021, "A Whiter Shade of Pale" by Procol Harum jumped up 150 spots to number three after the murder of Peter R. de Vries, who listed the song as his favourite and had it played at his funeral. 

Current events have also caused songs to drop on the list. In 2021, rumors about Marco Borsato's inappropriate behavior led to four of his songs falling off the list entirely. In 2022, Borsato was officially accused of sexual assault, and his songs all dropped by an average of 375 spots.

Social media are also used by voters to get a song into the list of all lists. A notable example is the Pokémon Theme.

The top 10

See also
 Serious Requestanother annual Dutch radio marathon in the month of December that reaches over half the population.

References

External links

Statistics of Top 2000 
nporadio2.nl Official website of the hosting radio station. 

Dutch music radio programs
Lists of rated songs
Music chart shows
1999 radio programme debuts
Rock music radio programs